The Women's 500 m time trial was held on 20 October 2017.

Results

Qualifying
The top 8 riders qualified for the final.

Final

References

Women's 500 m time trial
European Track Championships – Women's 500 m time trial